Meredith Sheldon (born October 20, 1988) is an American musician from Massachusetts. She credits Evan Dando with giving her a leg up in the music business, being an early supporter of her demos, and says the same of Marina and the Diamonds.

Meredith was the original bassist and backing vocals for Family of the Year. After leaving the band, she toured as support on first leg of Marina and the Diamonds' The Lonely Hearts Club Tour. She also toured with Dando-led The Lemonheads. At least for some time in 2012 she appeared on stage with Jen Turner, bassist, as part of a project referred to in the contemporary reviews as Alamar. In 2013 and 2014 she toured in support of Johnny Marr, opening for all his shows.

Personal information 
She lives on Martha's Vineyard.

The Bandcamp-downloadable studio music represents material the artist has been working on for several years. A full-length studio album is to be completed "as a present to myself... and to you!" by Christmas 2014 and published shortly thereafter.

She maintains a very low social media profile, having made public her disinclination to participate in Facebook or Twitter; in fact, the Facebook page listed under her name as a musician is a self-admitted fan page.

Discography 
 MLS (Digital album, EP) Bandcamp
 A La Mar (Sketches, Single) Bandcamp
 A La Mar 2 (Sketches, Single) Bandcamp
 A La Mar 3 (Sketches, Single) Bandcamp
 TBA (LP, 2015)

References

External links 
 Official webpage: Meredith Sheldon
 Bandcamp page:Meredith Sheldon, Massachusetts

American indie pop musicians
1988 births
Living people
Musicians from Berkeley, California
Guitarists from California
Guitarists from Massachusetts
21st-century American guitarists
Singer-songwriters from California
Singer-songwriters from Massachusetts
People from Martha's Vineyard, Massachusetts
21st-century American singers
21st-century American women guitarists